Gari-ye Pain (also Romanized as Garī-ye Pā’īn; also known as Garī-ye Soflá) is a village in Madvarat Rural District, in the Central District of Shahr-e Babak County, Kerman Province, Iran. At the 2006 census, its population was 27, in 9 families.

References 

Populated places in Shahr-e Babak County